Farmington is an unincorporated community in Marshall County, in the U.S. state of Tennessee.  The community is concentrated around the intersection of U.S. Route 31 and State Route 64 west of Shelbyville and east of Lewisburg.

History
A post office called Farmington was established in 1836, and remained in operation until 1902. Farmington was so named for its location in a farming district.

The community witnessed the Battle of Farmington of 1863, which resulted in a Union victory.

See also
Confederate Cemetery Monument

References

Unincorporated communities in Marshall County, Tennessee
Unincorporated communities in Tennessee